Discovery Science Latin America is a television channel in Latin America dedicated to science-themed programming, owned by Warner Bros. Discovery.

External links 

Programming guide official website 

Latin America
Television channels and stations established in 2005
Warner Bros. Discovery Americas